Phyllis Wyatt Johnson (née Squire) (8 December 1886 in Great Britain – 2 December 1967) was a British figure skater.

She won the silver medal in pair skating at the 1908 Olympic Games with James H. Johnson.  They captured the gold at the World Figure Skating Championships in 1909 and 1912.  In 1920, she won the bronze at the Olympics with new partner Basil Williams, became one of the oldest figure skating Olympic medalists. That year, she also finished fourth in ladies' singles.

Competitive highlights

Ladies' singles

*Coed

Pairs
(with James H. Johnson)

(with Basil Williams)

References

External links
Great Olympians Biographies

1886 births
1967 deaths
British female pair skaters
British female single skaters
Figure skaters at the 1908 Summer Olympics
Figure skaters at the 1920 Summer Olympics
Olympic bronze medallists for Great Britain
Olympic figure skaters of Great Britain
Olympic silver medallists for Great Britain
Olympic medalists in figure skating
World Figure Skating Championships medalists
Medalists at the 1920 Summer Olympics
Medalists at the 1908 Summer Olympics